The Royal Victoria Hospital was a health facility in the High Street in Dover, Kent, England. The original hospital is a Grade II listed building.

History
The hospital was established by the conversion of an early 19th century mansion known as Brook House to form the Dover Dispensary in 1851. An annex was added to celebrate the Golden Jubilee of Queen Victoria in 1887. It became the Dover Hospital in 1893 and the Royal Victoria Hospital in 1902. It joined the National Health Service in 1948. After services had transferred to the Buckland Hospital, it closed in May 1987 and the buildings were subsequently converted into apartments.

References

1851 establishments in England
Hospitals established in 1851
Hospital buildings completed in 1851
Hospitals in Kent
Defunct hospitals in England
Buildings and structures in Dover, Kent